The sooty barbet (Caloramphus hayii) is a species of bird in the family Megalaimidae. It is found in Malaysia, Myanmar, Thailand, Sumatra and formerly Singapore where it is extirpated.  Its natural habitat is subtropical or tropical moist lowland forests.

This species is split from the brown barbet (C. fuliginosus) which is an endemic species on Borneo.

References

sooty barbet
Birds of Malesia
sooty barbet
sooty barbet